The Maidan People's Union is an alliance in Ukraine formed by several political parties and non-partisan individuals and public organizations on the fifth Sunday (22 December 2013) of the Euromaidan-protests with the aim of "building a new Ukraine and a new Ukrainian government"
 by creating a new Ukrainian constitution, and removing corrupt judges and prosecutors. It also aims to organize opposition to the current regime and to coordinate the protest movement in all regions of the country. In practice this means broadening support for the goals of the organization in the pro-government and pro-presidential heartland East Ukraine.

During Euromaidan, the organization aimed to recruit millions of Ukrainians as members. According to co-head of the organization Arseniy Yatsenyuk, "it will be a little bit like the Solidarity movement in Poland".

History
On 30 November 2013 the opposition parties Batkivshchyna, UDAR and Svoboda set up the National Resistance Headquarters. At the time they controlled 168 seats of the 450 in the Verkhovna Rada (Ukraine's national parliament).

On 22 December 2013, the fifth ongoing week of the Euromaidan-protests (100,000 rallied in Kyiv) major opposition parties and non-partisans established a nationwide political movement called Maidan. "Maidan" refers to/is the nickname of Maidan Nezalezhnosti where the Euromaidan-protests are centered. The movement has the aim of broadening support for Euromaidan in East Ukraine where the support for the second Azarov Government and President Viktor Yanukovich is centred. (At the first day of the movement) opposition leader Arseniy Yatsenyuk stated "Every person who wants a fair and honest future must be in favour of this movement". Since 24 December 2013 the organization started to accept membership.

Agenda
The organization set several goals:
the formation of a new Constitution of Ukraine "that should make the Ukrainian people feel that they run the country"
the formation of an action plan for Ukraine by forming groups for each policy sector, ranging from economical to foreign policy
the formation of groups that provide legal, financial and organizational support to Euromaidan activists who are persecuted for participating in protests, particularly in Kharkiv and Odessa
"participation and protection" of the 2014 Ukrainian presidential election
establishing its branches in 20 regions
a strategy of Ukraine's development until 2025

Organization
Co-heads of the organization are Yulia Tymoshenko and Arseniy Yatsenyuk of Batkivshchyna, Vitali Klitschko of UDAR, Oleh Tyahnybok of Svoboda, University president of National University of Kyiv-Mohyla Academy Serhiy Kvit, leader of the organization Third Ukrainian Republic Yuriy Lutsenko and singer Ruslana

The council of the organization includes Taras Boiko, Oleksiy Haran, Vasyl Hatsko, Ihor Zhdanov, Andriy Illyenko, Irena Karpa, Serhiy Kvit, Vyacheslav Kyrylenko, Ihor Koliushko, Vitali Klitschko, Ruslan Koshulynsky, Ivan Krulko, Ruslana Lyzhychko, Ihor Lutsenko, Yuriy Lutsenko, Maria Matios, Andriy Mokhnyk, Valeriy Patskan, Oleh Osukhovsky, Sashko Polozhynsky, Petro Poroshenko, Vitaly Portnikov, Serhiy Rakhmaninov, Yehor Sobolev, Serhiy Sobolev, Oleksandr Sushko, Viktoria Siumar, Borys Tarasyuk, Yulia Tymoshenko, Oleksandr Turchynov, Oleh Tyahnybok, Valeriy Chaly, Refat Chubarov, Viktor Chumak, Zorian Shkiriak, Yelyzaveta Schepetylnykova, and Arseniy Yatsenyuk.

Notes

References

External links
Official website 

2013 establishments in Ukraine
Euromaidan
Political party alliances in Ukraine
Social movements in Ukraine
Ukrainian democracy movements